By taking on ships being built for foreign navies in British shipyards, a number of British-built 6-inch 50-calibre naval guns found their way into British service in World War I. Their specifications and performance differed from standard Royal Navy 6-inch guns but in British service they fired standard service 100-pound projectiles.

6-inch Mark XIII gun 

When World War I began, Armstrong-Whitworth were completing the battleship Sultan Osman I for the Ottoman Empire; it had originally begun as Rio de Janeiro for Brazil. Its secondary armament consisted of 20 of Armstrong-Whitworth's 6-inch 50 calibre guns, which were similar in design and characteristics to the 6-inch Mk XI gun in British service and used the same ammunition. To avoid the ship being used by Britain's enemies the battleship was seized and subsequently completed for the RN as HMS Agincourt and served in the Royal Navy in World War I. Its 6-inch guns were designated BL 6-inch Mk XIII.

Superfluous at the end of the war, Agincourt was decommissioned in 1921 and her 6-inch guns removed and used for coastal defence, and in 1939 the First World War era British gunboats Aphis and Ladybird each had their two 6-inch Mk VII guns replaced with 2 MK XIII guns, in which capacity they served in World War II.

6-inch Mark XIV and XV guns 

When World War I began, the Royal Navy had just taken possession of three river monitors originally built by Vickers for Brazil but which Brazil could not pay for. These were each equipped with two Vickers 6-inch 50-calibre guns in a twin turret, and became the s. These guns were very similar to the British service Mk XI gun, and in UK service they were designated BL 6-inch Mk XIV for the right-hand gun in the mounting, with breech opening to the right and BL 6-inch Mk XV for the left-hand gun, with its breech opening to the left. The guns of HMS Severn and HMS Mersey wore out early in the war from continuous use first bombarding the Belgian coast and later in East Africa, and were replaced by standard 6-inch Mk VII guns, while HMS Humber continued to use various refurbished Mk XIV and XV guns throughout the war for coastal bombardment.

6-inch Mark XVI gun 
At the beginning of World War I the British Government forcibly acquired the battleship Reshadieh which Vickers had just completed for the Ottoman Government. The ship entered service with the Royal Navy as  together with its armament which while of similar calibre to British service ordnance was of differing specification. These guns were designated 6-inch BL Mark XVI in British service. Some were redeployed in World War II for coast defence.

6-inch Mark XVII gun 

When World War I began, Armstrong-Whitworth were building the battleships Almirante Latorre and Almirante Cochrane for Chile. They were acquired by the British government and completed as the battleship HMS Canada and the aircraft carrier HMS Eagle. The secondary armament for each supplied by Armstrongs were 12 6-inch 50-calibre guns, which were designated 6-inch BL Mk XVII in British service. These guns were used from 1915 on HMS Canada until she was sold to Chile in 1920 as originally intended. HMS Eagle was completed after World War I and retained by the Royal Navy, with these guns retained as her primary defensive armament.

6-inch Mark XVIII gun 
When World War I began, Armstrong-Whitworth were building the coast defence ships Nidaros and Bjørgvin for Norway. They were acquired by the British government and completed as the monitors HMS Gorgon and HMS Glatton respectively. Their secondary armament as designed was four  guns designed by Armstrongs. In Royal Navy service these guns were relined to the standard British 6-inch calibre and they were adapted to fire standard 6-inch 100-pound shells.

Surviving Examples 

Aft 6-inch gun displayed on HMS M.33 (at Portsmouth Historic Dockyard, UK) is from Almirante Latorre (ex-Canada) donated to the ship from Chile in 2000.

Two pieces of 6-inch mark XVII coastal defense guns are to be seen at the "Mirador Punta Angamos", close to Mejillones, Chile.
Serial Numbers: No. 3308 and No. 3301

See also 
 List of naval guns

Notes

References 
 Tony DiGiulian, British 6"/50 (15.2 cm) BL Mark XIII
 Tony DiGiulian, Britain 6"/50 (15.2 cm) BL Mark XIV 6"/50 (15.2 cm) BL Mark XV
 Tony DiGiulian, British 6"/50 (15.2 cm) BL Mark XVII 6"/50 (15.2 cm) BL Mark XXI
 Tony DiGiulian, British 6"/49 (15.2 cm) BL Mark XVIII

External links 

 

Naval guns of the United Kingdom
World War I naval weapons of the United Kingdom
152 mm artillery
Coastal artillery